These are the official results of the men's long jump event at the 1987 IAAF World Championships in Rome, Italy. There were a total number of 40 participating athletes, with two qualifying groups and the final held on Saturday 5 September 1987.

Giovanni Evangelisti of Italy originally won the bronze with a jump of 8.38 m, but it was later determined that Italian field officials had entered a fake result for a jump of 7.85m.  Larry Myricks of the United States received the bronze medal nine months later.

Medalists

Schedule
All times are Central European Time (UTC+1)

Records
Existing records at the start of the event.

Qualifying round
Held on Friday 1987-09-04

Final

See also
 1983 Men's World Championships Long Jump (Helsinki)
 1984 Men's Olympic Long Jump (Los Angeles)
 1986 Men's European Championships Long Jump (Stuttgart)
 1988 Men's Olympic Long Jump (Seoul)
 1990 Men's European Championships Long Jump (Split)

Notes

References
 Results

L
Long jump at the World Athletics Championships